Andre Jamar Dixon (born February 19, 1986) is a former American football running back. He was signed by the Hartford Colonials as a first round draft pick in 2010. He played college football at Connecticut.

Early years
Dixon attended New Brunswick High School. He rushed for 1,018 yards as a senior with 20 touchdowns and earned four varsity football letters.

College career
Dixon enrolled to Connecticut and was redshirted during his freshman season in 2005. In 2006, he played in four games and appeared in each of the final three contests as a kickoff returner. In 2007 Dixon missed the first two games of the year but he returned to gain 809 rushing yards on 160 carries (5.1 average) with three touchdowns while also catching 24 passes for 280 yards and a touchdown. His 280 receiving yards are the most by a UConn running back since Chad Martin had 319 in 1998. One of his best season performances was against South Florida, when he rushed for a career-high 167 yards on a career-best 32 carries, posting 210 all-purpose yards.  He split game time with Donald Brown. He was named to the second-team All-Big East along with Tyvon Branch.

For the 2008 season, Dixon sprained his ankle in the preseason, opening the door for Donald Brown to step into the starting role.

In December 2008 Dixon, was suspended indefinitely from the football team following an arrest on drunken-driving charge. He was reinstated to the team shortly before the Huskies played the 2009 International Bowl on January 3, 2009.

In the 2010 PapaJohns.com Bowl, Dixon was named player of the game, and finished with 126 rushing yards and one touchdown.

Professional career

New York Giants
Dixon was signed as a rookie free agent by the New York Giants where he was briefly on the practice squad, but was released before the start of the season.

Hartford Colonials
Dixon tried out for the Hartford Colonials of the United Football League. He was later drafted in the first round of the 2010 UFL Draft by the Hartford Colonials as the number two overall pick.

Dixon made his debut September 18, 2010 at home against the Sacramento Mountain Lions in which he had a game high 94 rushing yards on 21 attempts.

Sacramento Mountain Lions
On August 19, 2011, Dixon signed with the Sacramento Mountain Lions.

Dixon was cut by the Mountain Lions on December 26, 2011.

Calgary Stampeders
In the off-season before the start of the 2013 CFL season Dixon signed with the Calgary Stampeders of the Canadian Football League. He was released prior to the start of the season.

Blacktips
Dixon signed with the Blacktips of the Fall Experimental Football League (FXFL) in 2015.

References

External links
Connecticut Huskies bio

1986 births
Living people
Sportspeople from New Brunswick, New Jersey
Players of American football from New Jersey
American football running backs
New Brunswick High School alumni
UConn Huskies football players
Hartford Colonials players
Sacramento Mountain Lions players
Blacktips (FXFL) players